Burdett is a surname. Notable people with the surname include:

Francis Burdett, 5th Baronet (1770–1844), English politician
George Burdett (disambiguation)
Henry Burdett, English financier and philanthropist
John Burdett (b. 1951), British crime novelist
Ricky Burdett (b. 1956), Professor of Urban Studies
Thomas Burdett (disambiguation)
 William Burdett, founded Alvecote Priory

See also
Burdett baronets
Christiana Burdett Campbell, (ca. 1723–1792) Colonial American innkeeper
Lew Burdette, major league baseball player, 2-time All-Star